The Milan Triennial XVII was the Triennial in Milan sanctioned by the Bureau of International Expositions (BIE) on the 5 June 1986.
Its theme was The Cities of the World and the Future of the Metropolis. 
It was held at the  Palazzo dell'Arte and ran from 21 September 1988 to 18 December 1988.

References 

1988 in Italy
Tourist attractions in Milan
World's fairs in Milan